The International Journal of Multimedia Information Retrieval is a quarterly peer-reviewed scientific journal published by Springer Science+Business Media covering all aspects of multimedia information retrieval. It was established in 2012 and the editor-in-chief is Michael Lew (University of Leiden).

Indexing and abstracting
The journal is abstracted and indexed in Science Citation Index Expanded (Impact Factor 3.2, 2020), Inspec, ProQuest databases, and Scopus.

References

External links
 

Computer science journals
English-language journals
Publications established in 2012
Quarterly journals
Springer Science+Business Media academic journals